Maha Shaktimaan is a 1985 Indian Hindi-language 3D film by Swamy V.S.R. and produced by P. Babji. It stars Raj Babbar and Meenakshi Seshadri.

Plot 
King Purshotam Singh rules over his kingdom fairly. He lives with his family; his wife, Ahilya, an adult son, and a new-born baby, Ajay. His enemy Maharudra attacks the kingdom and Purshotam's army can not protect the kingdom, and his elder son is killed. Maharudra captures power and rules over the region mercilessly. Maharudra commits massacre and terrorises the whole kingdom.

Ither Kings surrender to his might. Years later, Maharudra is still the ruler, but quite unknown to him, rebels are organising a war against him. Rajkumar Ajay Singh, that baby son of former king Purshotam is leading them. Ajoy's friend, Pratap; Pratap's lover Padmini and a lady Madhuri are with Ajay.

Cast
 Raj Babbar as Rajkumar Ajay P. Singh 
 Meenakshi Seshadri as Madhuri 
 Karan Shah as Prince Pratap
 Kim as Padmini 
 Danny Denzongpa as Maharudra 
 Ranjeet as Bhairav 
 Urmila Bhatt as Maharani Ahilya P. Singh 
 Pradeep Kumar as Maharaja Purshotam Singh
 Praveen Kumar as Betaal
 Jayamalini as Dancer

Soundtrack
Lyricist: Indeevar

References

External links

1980s Hindi-language films
1985 films
1985 3D films
Indian 3D films
Films scored by Bappi Lahiri